The Veluće mine is one of the largest cobalt mines in Serbia. The mine is located in Veluće in Rasina District. The mine has reserves amounting to 3 million tonnes of ore grading 0.08% cobalt.

References 

Cobalt mines in Serbia